Allan Clifford Welsh (born 18 February 1994) is an Australian professional footballer who plays as a central defender for Adelaide Comets in the National Premier Leagues.

Club career
On 12 September 2014 he signed his first senior professional contract with A-League side Newcastle Jets. At the end on the 2014–15 season he was released from the club and returned to Croydon Kings in the National Premier Leagues.

References

External links

1994 births
Living people
Association football defenders
Australian soccer players
Soccer players from Adelaide
Croydon Kings players
Adelaide United FC players
Newcastle Jets FC players
Adelaide Comets FC players
A-League Men players
National Premier Leagues players